The 1993 Women's European Volleyball Championship was the 18th edition of the event, organised by Europe's governing volleyball body, the Confédération Européenne de Volleyball. It was hosted in Brno and Zlín, Czech Republic from 24 September to 2 October 1993.

Participating teams

*Note: Although the Czech Republic and Slovakia became separate countries in 1993, the Czechoslovakia Volleyball Federation (ČSFV) was not yet separate, therefore the team competed as Czechoslovakia (officially as Czech Republic + Slovak Republic). Czechoslovakia had already been chosen as host country before the country was dissolved.

Format
The tournament was played in two different stages. In the first stage, the twelve participants were divided in two groups of six teams each. A single round-robin format was played within each group to determine the teams' group position. The second stage of the tournament consisted of two sets of semifinals to determine the tournament final ranking. The group stage firsts and seconds played the semifinals for 1st to 4th place, group stage thirds and fourths played the 5th to 8th place semifinals and the remaining four teams which finished group stages as fifth and sixth ended all tied in final ranking at 9th place. The pairing of the semifinals was made so teams played against the opposite group teams which finished in a different position (1st played against 2nd, 3rd played against 4th).

Pools composition

Squads

Venues

Preliminary round

 All times are Central European Summer Time (UTC+02:00).

Pool A
venue location: Brno, Czech Republic

|}

 
|}

Pool B
venue location: Zlín, Czech Republic

|}

 
|}

Final round
venue location: Brno, Czech Republic
 All times are Central European Summer Time (UTC+02:00).

5th–8th place
 Pools A and B third and fourth positions play each other.

5th–8th semifinals

|}

7th place match

|}

5th place match

|}

Final
 Pools A and B first and second positions play each other.

Semifinals

|}

3rd place match

|}

Final

|}

Final ranking

Individual awards
MVP: 
Best Spiker: 
Best Blocker: 
Best Scorer: 
Best Setter:

References
 Confédération Européenne de Volleyball (CEV)

External links
 Results at todor66.com

European Volleyball Championships
V
Women's European Volleyball Championship, 1993
Women's European Volleyball Championships
Women's volleyball in the Czech Republic
Sport in Brno
Sport in Zlín
September 1993 sports events in Europe
October 1993 sports events in Europe